The Chevrolet (S-10) Blazer and its badge engineered GMC (S-15) Jimmy counterpart are compact/mid-size SUVs manufactured and marketed by Chevrolet and GMC from the 1983 through 2005 model years, over two generations – until the early 1990s alongside these brands' full-size SUVs with near identical nameplates, but lacking removable hardtops. From the 1992 model year, GMC's big Jimmy had become the 'Yukon', and so the S-15 prefix was dropped on the smaller GMC Jimmy. Starting with the 1995 second generation, the large Blazer was rebranded as the Chevrolet Tahoe, and these mid-size SUVs were simply launched as the 'all-new Chevrolet Blazer'.

Upon launch, these models were  shorter and  narrower than the full-size K5 Blazer, sometimes leading to the nickname of 'baby Blazer'. Like their full-sized counterparts, the S-series Blazer and Jimmy were originally offered only in a two-door body style. In 1991, four-door versions were added, with a 6.5 in (17 cm) longer wagon body.

The S-10 Blazer and S-15 Jimmy were based on the Chevrolet S-10 and GMC S-15 pickup trucks, sharing many components.  and were manufactured in Pontiac, Michigan; Linden, New Jersey; Moraine, Ohio; Shreveport, Louisiana; and São José dos Campos, Brazil.

In the United States, retail sales of four-door Blazer models ended in 2004; though production of two- and four-door models for fleet sales continued into 2005. In the Canadian market, four-door models of the Blazer and Jimmy were sold until the 2004 model year and until the 2005 model year for the two-door models of both.

The Brazilian variant,  based on the second-generation S-series, continued in production in Brazil through 2012 with its own sheetmetal stampings which were also used on the Chinese, Indonesian and Russian versions. In North America, the Moraine, Ohio plant produced only 4-door vehicles, with both 2- and 4-door models being produced at Linden, which was the main assembly plant after the switch (for the 1995 model year) from Pontiac West Assembly in Pontiac, Michigan, which closed in 1994.

First generation (1983–1994)

In 1982, General Motors introduced  the Chevrolet S-10 Blazer, and its rebadged GMC S-15 Jimmy variant, as 1983 models. They were based on, and co-developed, with the 1982 Chevrolet S-10 pickup truck, introduced one year prior, to replace the Isuzu-based Chevrolet LUV truck.

The S-series Blazer and Jimmy did not feature removable hardtops, like their full-size K5 counterparts, and were for a long time, like them, only offered in a two-door bodystyle. Only in March 1990, four-door versions of the S-10 Blazer and Jimmy were introduced as 1991 models, with a  greater wheelbase and length.

Base power was provided by GM's 2.0 L OHV four-cylinder engine, producing . A 2.8 L,  V6 was offered as an option (coincidentally this engine was also used in Jeep's competing Cherokee until 1987). Due to emissions laws, a 1.9 L gasoline inline-four built by Isuzu was offered as the base model engine in California in place of the 2.0 L engine, while an Isuzu 2.2 L diesel engine (also used in the S-series pickups) producing  was offered as an option.

The 1.9 and 2.0 L gasoline fours and the 2.2 L diesel were dropped after 1985, replaced by the larger 2.5 L Iron Duke engine. The V6 was refitted with a throttle-body fuel injection system for 1986 in order to improve performance and fuel economy.

In order for it to keep being competitive, the Blazer and Jimmy received a new  V6 option for 1988 (also used with the Astro/Safari vans, short wheelbase G-series vans, and light duty C/K-1500 trucks), based on the Chevrolet Small-Block V8 engine, producing a respectable . The 2.8 L V6 was discontinued after 1990, making the 4.3 L the sole available engine. A 5-speed manual transmission (Getrag 290/Hydramatic 290/5LM60, sourced from the GMT400) was added to the option list, replacing the Borg-Warner T-5.

In March 1990, 4-door versions of the S-10 Blazer and Jimmy were introduced as a 1991 model; the 4-door had a 6.5 in longer wheelbase (2-doors had a 100.5 in wheelbase - six inches (152 mm) longer than the Ford Bronco II) and a one-piece front grille with a painted black insert (1990 two-door S-10 Blazers and Jimmys had the three-piece grille). This new grille also did away with the separate metal filler panel under the grille, since the grille is taller and took its place. Early production models between March and August 1990 were initially available as a four-wheel drive only; 2WD versions commenced production around Summer 1990. This came just months ahead of the introduction of the Ford Explorer, which replaced the Bronco II; six-and-a-half years after the segment-leading Cherokee debuted with four doors. 

The upscale Oldsmobile Bravada appeared later in the year featuring an All-Wheel-Drive package called "Smart-Trak" (using a BorgWarner 4472 transfer case, shared with the AWD Astro/Safari).

1992 models were similar to 1991s - the only way to tell the difference is the rear back glass (the rear glass does not have any trim to which two black buttons serve as the back glass strut mounting points) and front grille (chrome shell with argent silver inserts). The interior was a carryover from 1991 with the exception of the center console and steering wheel (X-bar style similar to the one used in the GMT400 trucks). Also, the "S-15" name was dropped from the Jimmy. The S10 Blazer also introduced an upscale Tahoe and Sport trim packages, the Tahoe LT, which was rebadged as the LT in 1995 whilst the Tahoe package was renamed as the LS. The Tahoe LT had its own exterior décor with faded lower body lines on the lower rockers along with Tahoe LT badges - this also included an overhead console and keyless remote door locks). Sport package had bigger sway bars, slightly modified suspension and 30x9.5 or optional 31x10.5 tires. Body trim included also black plastic fender flares, front fog lights and spare tire carrier on the tailgate. 

1992 was the first model year where the S10 Blazer and Jimmy offered an NP233 electronic transfer case for as a drivetrain option. This deleted the Manual gear range selector with a 3 position switch located to the left of the gauge cluster in the same location that the rear defrost button would be located on non-electronic transfer-case and 2WD model Blazers and Jimmies (when optioned with the electronic transfer case the defrost button assembly is positioned below the headlight switch). The electronic transfer-case added luxury however there was no neutral position with the electronic transfer case, so the owner's manual stated that the drive shaft had to be removed when the vehicle was being towed. The fuel lines, which were routed on the driver side frame rail to the TBI fuel injectors, were redesigned where the fuel inlets entered the rear of the engine (same as the GMT400). This was phased in because of the L35 option which used a similar fuel line setup. The serpentine accessory drive for the 4.3L motor was modified where the air pump was eliminated and further lightened.

From at least 1991 onward, all S10 Blazers and Jimmies came with four-wheel anti-lock brakes as standard equipment. The first two years of the ABS system had axleshafts with pressed-on ABS toner rings, which were eliminated during the latter half of the 1993 model year (rear ABS control was now done via the vehicle speed sensor). A 5-speed manual transmission remained standard through 1994, but only with the TBI engine. Only the two  engines were offered as options - the base TBI and the CPI (introduced in 1992 for the S-series and Chevrolet Astro minivans; the latter had the "Vortec" logo on the intake plenum).

1993 had a few changes - the center console was raised (with a dual cup holder), and the 4L60E transmission replaced the 700r4. The grille (alongside the S-10 pickup) was revised (which was a chrome-plated version of the base work truck grille found on base S-10 pickups), along with the addition of optional 5-spoke alloy rims (for the 2WD model - basically a copy of the 3rd generation Camaro Z28 15" alloy rim).

Although the second generation S-series pickup debuted in 1994, the S-10 Blazer and Jimmy continued unchanged for that year, with the only significant changes being a third brake light and the discontinuation of the rear spoiler. 1994 was a transition year for many automakers when it came to switching from R-12 Freon to CFC-free R134a refrigerant. The redesigned 1994 S-10 and Sonoma pickups used R134a refrigerant. Despite being nearly identical to the 1993 models, the entire 1994 model year full-size pickup and SUV lineup (C/K, Sierra, Suburban, Yukon, etc.), also used R134a. The 1994 S-10 Blazer and Jimmy seem to have used R-12 until the end of their production run and subsequent replacement with redesigned 1995 models that looked like the new-for-1994 pickups.

Second generation (1995)

The all-new Blazer was introduced in 1994 as a 1995 model year. This time, it lost the S-10 prefix for simpler identification, as the full-size K5 Blazer was discontinued. (the GMT400-based Blazer was rebadged as the Tahoe; the Tahoe package which was the base trim for past S10s was redesignated as the LS.) Exterior and interior size were increased, bumping it up to a mid-sized SUV. The Blazer was Playboy Magazines Truck of the Year for 1995 and was also the unanimous winner of the Motor Trend 1995 Truck of the Year. The '95 Blazer was also awarded North American Truck of the Year at the North American International Auto Show in Detroit.

The second-generation Blazer was available with the 4.3 L V6 engine only, and most models featured four-wheel drive via an electronic transfer case; 1997 was the last year a manual transfer case (with floor-shifter) for four-wheel drive  was offered. A drivers airbag came, but a passenger airbag was not immediately introduced.

In 1998, the interior and exterior received some cosmetic changes. The makeover offered a new dashboard with larger buttons and more ergonomically correct driving controls, as well as larger door handles, and headrests for the rear bench.  A passenger airbag is now standard. A front grille similar to the Chevrolet C/K pickup line's stacked-headlight system replaced the older single-headlight system, similar to the full-size GMT400 trucks. 4 wheel disc brakes became standard equipment, fitted with aluminum dual-piston calipers (the front disc brakes were redesigned with the dual-piston calipers and 11" diameter brake rotors (steering knuckles now have sealed hub assemblies) while the truck models retained the 1978-era single piston disc brakes originally sourced and shared from GM's G-body lineup).  In 1999, new folding mirrors replaced the old folding mirrors. 2000 saw new front bumpers and the trim running along the sides and bumpers was removed.  For the 2001 model year, the truck received a new center console.

Another upscale model was the 1998 GMC Envoy. It used the same engines and had many of the same upgrades as the Bravada. The 1998 model Envoy featured an optional upgrade to High Intensity Discharge headlamps, and several other visual modifications. To celebrate the 30th anniversary of the Jimmy nameplate, the Jimmy Diamond Edition was launched. Not too different from the Envoy, it featured leather seats with a diamond pattern, special diamond logos, and an aluminum silver plate along lower sides of the SUV.

In 1999, Chevrolet introduced a limited edition 'TrailBlazer' appearance package that was available as an upgrade to the LS and LT trims. The package featured gold-accented alloy rims and trim along with several interior/exterior modifications and upgrades and was marketed until the introduction of the GMT360 series for the 2002 model year. The Trailblazer's headlamps, which featured daytime running lamps, would be available on various Blazer models until production ended. Upon introduction of the 2002 Chevrolet TrailBlazer and the GMC Envoy, production continued after their successors came to the market, with the Jimmy being sold only in Canada and, in the 2005 model year, 4-door models sold to vehicle fleets.

At the same time, a Blazer Xtreme (only on the 2-door model) was added to the lineup, based on the S10 Xtreme.  This sub-model lasted until 2004.

The second-generation Blazer was officially sold in Taiwan, between 1995 and 1996.The ZR2 PackageThe ZR2 package was only offered on the 2 door Blazer as the 2 door had the shorter wheelbase. It had a wider ladder-type frame which made its track approx. 3.9 inches wider. It also lifted the Blazer about 3 inches which made it be able to clear 31x10.5 tires on 15 inch wheels. An enhanced front (7.25" ring gear) and rear (8.5" ring gear) axles w/ 3.73:1 rear-axle ratio. Larger wheel and axle bearings. A front anti-sway bar, skid plates, Bilstein shocks, and a beefier rear axle. This package cost a little over $1000 and was first introduced on the S10 pickup in 1994 and carried over to the Blazer in 1996.

IIHS gave a P for poor in the frontal offset crash test.Right-hand drive model'''

The right-hand drive Blazer has been assembled in Indonesia since 1995. In 1998, General Motors launched the right-hand drive version to be built in the United States for the export to the countries with left-hand rule of road. The S-10 Blazer destined for the Japanese market had some modifications to suit the Japanese people: turn-signal stalk moving closer to the steering wheel, external rear-view mirrors electrically folding in to fit through the narrow streets, brake pedal changing its angle for easier reach, larger wheel arches, and a few miscellaneous changes.

The right-hand-drive dashboard was also used for Holden Suburban with the passenger (left) side stretched to fit the wider Suburban. 

Trims and models

Second generation engines
 1995 -  Vortec 4300 L35 V6, CPFI, / (VIN W)
 1996–2002 -  Vortec 4300 L35 V6, CSFI, / (VIN W)
 2002–2005 -  Vortec 4300 LU3 V6, MPFI, / (VIN X)
 (Middle East only) 1996-2005 - , GM Family II engine I4, MPFI, /

Indonesian engines
 SOHC 8 valve, GM Family II engine (C22NE) I4, MPFI, / (SLi, Montera (LN, LS, LV, Sport, XR)) DOHC 16 valve, GM Family II engine (Z22XE) I4, MPFI, / (LT)Brazilian engines

 1996-2001 - , GM Family II engine I4, MPFI, /
 2001-2011 - , GM Family II engine I4, MPFI, /
 1996-2001 - , Vortec 4300 V6, /
 2001-2005 - , Vortec 4300 V6, /
 1996-2011 - , MWM Sprint 2.8 Turbo Diesel'' I4, /

References

External links

 

All-wheel-drive vehicles
S-10 Blazer
Rear-wheel-drive vehicles
1980s cars
1990s cars
2000s cars
Compact sport utility vehicles
Mid-size sport utility vehicles
Cars introduced in 1983
Cars of Brazil
Motor vehicles manufactured in the United States
Cars discontinued in 2012